3Y or 3-Y may refer to:
3Y, IATA code for Kartika Airlines
3Y, one of several models of Toyota Y engine
3Y, call sign for Norway; see Amateur radio call signs of Antarctica

See also
Y3 (disambiguation)